Ebert is a surname of German origin. Notable people with the surname include:

 Alex Ebert (born 1978), lead singer for the band Ima Robot
 Anton Ebert (1845–1896), Austrian painter
 Beanie Ebert (1902–1980), American football player
 Blanche Ebert Seaver (1891–1994), American philanthropist and musician
 Brad Ebert (born 1990), Australian football player
 Brett Ebert (born 1983), Australian football player
 Carl Ebert (1887–1980), opera manager and director 
 Carl Ebert (painter) (1821–1885), German landscape painter
 Friedrich Adolf Ebert (1791–1834), German bibliographer and librarian
 Friedrich Ebert (1871–1925), German politician and President of Germany 1919-1925 (SPD)
 Friedrich Ebert Jr. (1894–1979), German politician (SPD and SED)
 Gabriel Ebert (born 1988), American actor
 Hermann Ebert (1861–1913), German physicist
 Jakob Ebert (1549–1614), German theologian and poet
 Johann Arnold Ebert (1723–1795), German writer and translator
 Johann Jakob Ebert (1737–1805), German mathematician and author
 Karl Ebert (1916–1974), Catholic theologian and auxiliary bishop
 Karl Egon Ebert (1801–1882), Bohemian German poet
 Patrick Ebert (born 1987), German footballer
 Roger Ebert (1942–2013), American film critic
 Russell Ebert (1949–2021), Australian rules football player
 Ute Ebert, German and Dutch physicist
 Ebert (footballer) (born 1993), Ebert Cardoso da Silva, Brazilian footballer

See also

Eberts (disambiguation)

German-language surnames
Surnames from given names